白山市 may refer to:
Baishan, a city in Jilin, China
Hakusan, Ishikawa, a city in Ishikawa, Japan